Alfredo Bovet (6 May 1909, in Cully, Switzerland – 18 January 1993, in Renens, Switzerland) was a Swiss-born Italian cyclist. His brother Enrico Bovet was also a professional cyclist.

Palmares

1932
1st overall Milan–San Remo
2nd overall Tre Valli Varesine
2nd overall Great Land Price

1933
1st of stage 3, stage 9 and general classification Volta a Catalunya
1st overall Tre Valli Varesine
2nd overall Milan–San Remo
3rd Italian National Road Race Championships
4th overall Giro d'Italia

1938
3rd overall Milan–San Remo

References

1909 births
1993 deaths
Swiss male cyclists
Italian male cyclists
Swiss emigrants to Italy
Sportspeople from the canton of Vaud